Habip Eksik (born 1985) is a Turkish politician who won a seat in the Turkish parliament in June 2018 with the HDP from electoral district of Iğdır.

External links
Grand National Assembly of Turkey: Habip Eksik  

 
1985 births
Deputies of Iğdır
Living people
People from Iğdır
Peoples' Democratic Party (Turkey) politicians
Members of the 27th Parliament of Turkey